Houthoff Buruma The Game is a serious game developed in 2010 by Houthoff Buruma, one of the largest law firms in the Netherlands, and Ranj Serious Games. The Game is considered to be the first game to be used in the area of business services. Designed for recruitment purposes, law graduates are challenged to display their skills in the area of corporate acquisitions. On 30 October 2017, Houthoff Buruma changed its name to Houthoff.

Background 
Houthoff Buruma The Game was introduced at the World Expo 2010 in Shanghai on May 26, 2010.

Awards
 Winner of 'E-Virtuoses Award', 2011 
 Winner of 'SAN Accent' 2011, Category Personnel 
 Winner of the 'European Innovative Games Award 2010' 
 Winner of the Hubbard One 'Excellence in Legal Marketing Award' 2011

Gameplay 
The player represents China Mining & Marine. To meet the unprecedented energy goals of the Chinese government, this state-owned giant has to construct the Panlong Renewable Energy Park within an ambitious time frame. To succeed in such a short time, China Mining & Marine needs six specific vessels equipped with a unique installation technology. However, these six vessels are all in the hands of one company: 't Hoen Marine & Offshore, a century-old Dutch family business that also possesses the latest technology and the essential know-how. China Mining & Marine needs those six vessels as soon as possible and is determined to acquire 't Hoen. The player has 90 minutes to convince enough shareholders to sell their shares and to draft a 'Letter of Intent'.

Characters 
Ding Hong: Senior Member, Communist Party of China / President, China Mining & Marine
Arie 't Hoen jr.: Pater Familias / no longer a shareholder of 't Hoen Marine & Offshore
Johan 't Hoen: Chief Executive Officer, 't Hoen Marine & Offshore
Klaas 't Hoen: Chief Technology Officer, 't Hoen Marine & Offshore
Margreet 't Hoen: Shareholder, 't Hoen Marine & Offshore / not active in the operations of 't Hoen Marine & Offshore
Yulia Galkinova: Fiancée of Klaas 't Hoen
Sandra Vrooman: Partner, Corporate Transactions, Houthoff Buruma
Rebecca Grey: Personal Assistant to Sandra Vrooman

References

External links 

Business simulation games
Video games developed in the Netherlands